The 2022 FIM Motocross World Championship was the 66th FIM Motocross World Championship season.

In the MXGP class, Jeffrey Herlings started the season as the reigning champion after picking up his fifth world title in 2021. The reigning MX2 world champion, Maxime Renaux did not defend his title as he moved into the MXGP category after he picked up his maiden world title in the previous year.

Race calendar and results
The championship was contested over eighteen rounds in Europe, Asia and South America.

MXGP

MX2

Grand Prix locations

MXGP

Entry list

Riders Championship

Manufacturers Championship 

Vsevolod Brylyakov was a neutral competitor using the designation MFR (Motorcycle Federation of Russia), as the World Anti-Doping Agency implemented a ban on Russia competing at World Championships.

MX2

Entry list

Riders Championship

Manufacturers Championship

See also
 2022 FIM Women's Motocross World Championship
 2022 Motocross des Nations
 2022 European Motocross Championship

References

External links
 Official website

Motocross World Championship seasons
Motocross